The Pravoberezhny constituency (No.88) is a Russian legislative constituency in Voronezh Oblast. The constituency covers parts of Voronezh and Voronezh Oblast on the right bank of the Voronezh River.

Members elected

Election results

1993

|-
! colspan=2 style="background-color:#E9E9E9;text-align:left;vertical-align:top;" |Candidate
! style="background-color:#E9E9E9;text-align:left;vertical-align:top;" |Party
! style="background-color:#E9E9E9;text-align:right;" |Votes
! style="background-color:#E9E9E9;text-align:right;" |%
|-
|style="background-color:#EA3C38"|
|align=left|Igor Muravyov
|align=left|Civic Union
|
|24.05%
|-
|style="background-color:"| 
|align=left|Olga Babkina
|align=left|Kedr
| -
|14.70%
|-
| colspan="5" style="background-color:#E9E9E9;"|
|- style="font-weight:bold"
| colspan="3" style="text-align:left;" | Total
| 
| 100%
|-
| colspan="5" style="background-color:#E9E9E9;"|
|- style="font-weight:bold"
| colspan="4" |Source:
|
|}

1995

|-
! colspan=2 style="background-color:#E9E9E9;text-align:left;vertical-align:top;" |Candidate
! style="background-color:#E9E9E9;text-align:left;vertical-align:top;" |Party
! style="background-color:#E9E9E9;text-align:right;" |Votes
! style="background-color:#E9E9E9;text-align:right;" |%
|-
|style="background-color:"|
|align=left|Vasily Kobylkin
|align=left|Communist Party
|
|20.03%
|-
|style="background-color:"|
|align=left|Igor Muravyov (incumbent)
|align=left|Independent
|
|11.79%
|-
|style="background-color:"|
|align=left|Valentin Pavlov
|align=left|Liberal Democratic Party
|
|6.92%
|-
|style="background-color:"|
|align=left|Alla Neretina
|align=left|Our Home – Russia
|
|6.92%
|-
|style="background-color:"| 
|align=left|Olga Babkina
|align=left|Kedr
|
|6.00%
|-
|style="background-color:#1C1A0D"|
|align=left|Aleksandr Boldyrev
|align=left|Forward, Russia!
|
|5.76%
|-
|style="background-color:"|
|align=left|Yevgeny Novichikhin
|align=left|Agrarian Party
|
|5.07%
|-
|style="background-color:"|
|align=left|Sergey Shaposhnikov
|align=left|Yabloko
|
|5.01%
|-
|style="background-color:"|
|align=left|Igor Kozhukhov
|align=left|Independent
|
|3.54%
|-
|style="background-color:#FE4801"|
|align=left|Vyacheslav Gulimov
|align=left|Pamfilova–Gurov–Lysenko
|
|3.10%
|-
|style="background-color:#D50000"|
|align=left|Nadezhda Sudorgina
|align=left|Communists and Working Russia - for the Soviet Union
|
|3.03%
|-
|style="background-color:#F21A29"|
|align=left|Dmitry Shamardin
|align=left|Trade Unions and Industrialists – Union of Labour
|
|2.42%
|-
|style="background-color:"|
|align=left|Nikolay Malyshev
|align=left|Independent
|
|2.38%
|-
|style="background-color:#CE1100"|
|align=left|Ivan Obraztsov
|align=left|My Fatherland
|
|2.00%
|-
|style="background-color:#EE2D2A"|
|align=left|Gennady Kotlyarov
|align=left|Block of Djuna
|
|1.48%
|-
|style="background-color:#FFF22E"|
|align=left|Sergey Neprokin
|align=left|Beer Lovers Party
|
|0.72%
|-
|style="background-color:"|
|align=left|Georgy Orlanov
|align=left|Independent
|
|0.53%
|-
|style="background-color:#000000"|
|colspan=2 |against all
|
|10.61%
|-
| colspan="5" style="background-color:#E9E9E9;"|
|- style="font-weight:bold"
| colspan="3" style="text-align:left;" | Total
| 
| 100%
|-
| colspan="5" style="background-color:#E9E9E9;"|
|- style="font-weight:bold"
| colspan="4" |Source:
|
|}

1999

|-
! colspan=2 style="background-color:#E9E9E9;text-align:left;vertical-align:top;" |Candidate
! style="background-color:#E9E9E9;text-align:left;vertical-align:top;" |Party
! style="background-color:#E9E9E9;text-align:right;" |Votes
! style="background-color:#E9E9E9;text-align:right;" |%
|-
|style="background-color:#7C273A"|
|align=left|Georgy Kostin
|align=left|Movement in Support of the Army
|
|21.59%
|-
|style="background-color:"|
|align=left|Vera Popova
|align=left|Independent
|
|11.53%
|-
|style="background-color:"|
|align=left|Boris Gribanov
|align=left|Independent
|
|9.91%
|-
|style="background-color:#3B9EDF"|
|align=left|Nikolay Averin
|align=left|Fatherland – All Russia
|
|5.34%
|-
|style="background-color:"|
|align=left|Yegor Merkulov
|align=left|Independent
|
|4.69%
|-
|style="background-color:"|
|align=left|Vyacheslav Gulimov
|align=left|Yabloko
|
|4.62%
|-
|style="background-color:"|
|align=left|Aleksandr Kosarev
|align=left|Independent
|
|4.37%
|-
|style="background-color:"|
|align=left|Nikolay Kuralesin
|align=left|Independent
|
|4.16%
|-
|style="background-color:#FCCA19"|
|align=left|Galina Kudryavtseva
|align=left|Congress of Russian Communities-Yury Boldyrev Movement
|
|3.65%
|-
|style="background-color:"|
|align=left|Andrey Petrochenko
|align=left|Independent
|
|2.93%
|-
|style="background-color:"|
|align=left|Vasily Kobylkin (incumbent)
|align=left|Independent
|
|2.16%
|-
|style="background-color:"|
|align=left|Boris Belyayev
|align=left|Independent
|
|1.48%
|-
|style="background-color:"|
|align=left|Lyudmila Kislova
|align=left|Independent
|
|1.31%
|-
|style="background-color:#C21022"|
|align=left|Vasily Panin
|align=left|Party of Pensioners
|
|1.26%
|-
|style="background-color:#020266"|
|align=left|Sergey Khrabskov
|align=left|Russian Socialist Party
|
|0.96%
|-
|style="background-color:"|
|align=left|Sergey Kravchenko
|align=left|Independent
|
|0.77%
|-
|style="background-color:"|
|align=left|Yury Pozhidayev
|align=left|Independent
|
|0.59%
|-
|style="background-color:#084284"|
|align=left|Igor Lykin
|align=left|Spiritual Heritage
|
|0.24%
|-
|style="background-color:#000000"|
|colspan=2 |against all
|
|16.59%
|-
| colspan="5" style="background-color:#E9E9E9;"|
|- style="font-weight:bold"
| colspan="3" style="text-align:left;" | Total
| 
| 100%
|-
| colspan="5" style="background-color:#E9E9E9;"|
|- style="font-weight:bold"
| colspan="4" |Source:
|
|}

2003

|-
! colspan=2 style="background-color:#E9E9E9;text-align:left;vertical-align:top;" |Candidate
! style="background-color:#E9E9E9;text-align:left;vertical-align:top;" |Party
! style="background-color:#E9E9E9;text-align:right;" |Votes
! style="background-color:#E9E9E9;text-align:right;" |%
|-
|style="background-color:"|
|align=left|Aleksandr Sysoyev
|align=left|Independent
|
|18.03%
|-
|style="background-color:"|
|align=left|Galina Kudryavtseva
|align=left|Independent
|
|12.34%
|-
|style="background-color:"|
|align=left|Georgy Kostin (incumbent)
|align=left|Communist Party
|
|12.23%
|-
|style="background-color:"|
|align=left|Aleksandr Lapin
|align=left|Independent
|
|10.00%
|-
|style="background-color:#1042A5"|
|align=left|Nikolay Suntsov
|align=left|Union of Right Forces
|
|8.10%
|-
|style="background-color:#00A1FF"|
|align=left|Vera Popova
|align=left|Party of Russia's Rebirth-Russian Party of Life
|
|7.73%
|-
|style="background-color:"|
|align=left|Yury Anokhin
|align=left|Independent
|
|6.33%
|-
|style="background-color:"|
|align=left|Aleksey Yefentyev
|align=left|Agrarian Party
|
|5.80%
|-
|style="background-color:"|
|align=left|Nikolay Kuralesin
|align=left|Independent
|
|2.94%
|-
|style="background-color:"|
|align=left|Alla Kazmina
|align=left|Liberal Democratic Party
|
|2.30%
|-
|style="background-color:#000000"|
|colspan=2 |against all
|
|12.27%
|-
| colspan="5" style="background-color:#E9E9E9;"|
|- style="font-weight:bold"
| colspan="3" style="text-align:left;" | Total
| 
| 100%
|-
| colspan="5" style="background-color:#E9E9E9;"|
|- style="font-weight:bold"
| colspan="4" |Source:
|
|}

2016

|-
! colspan=2 style="background-color:#E9E9E9;text-align:left;vertical-align:top;" |Candidate
! style="background-color:#E9E9E9;text-align:left;vertical-align:top;" |Party
! style="background-color:#E9E9E9;text-align:right;" |Votes
! style="background-color:#E9E9E9;text-align:right;" |%
|-
|style="background-color: " |
|align=left|Sergey Chizhov
|align=left|United Russia
|131,759
|58.91%
|-
|style="background-color: " |
|align=left|Andrey Pomerantsev
|align=left|Communist Party
|31,292
|13.99%
|-
|style="background-color: " |
|align=left|Svetlana Izmaylova
|align=left|A Just Russia
|15,250
|6.86%
|-
|style="background-color: " |
|align=left|Aleksandr Ovsyannikov
|align=left|Liberal Democratic Party
|14,524
|6.49%
|-
|style="background:"|
|align=left|Oksana Averyanova
|align=left|Communists of Russia
|12,149
|5.43%
|-
|style="background:"|
|align=left|Gennady Ponomarev
|align=left|Yabloko
|6,002
|2.68%
|-
|style="background-color: " |
|align=left|Sergey Kochetov
|align=left|Patriots of Russia
|4,094
|1.83%
|-
|style="background:"|
|align=left|Kirill Osinin
|align=left|Party of Growth
|3,436
|1.54%
|-
| colspan="5" style="background-color:#E9E9E9;"|
|- style="font-weight:bold"
| colspan="3" style="text-align:left;" | Total
| 223,666
| 100%
|-
| colspan="5" style="background-color:#E9E9E9;"|
|- style="font-weight:bold"
| colspan="4" |Source:
|
|}

2021

|-
! colspan=2 style="background-color:#E9E9E9;text-align:left;vertical-align:top;" |Candidate
! style="background-color:#E9E9E9;text-align:left;vertical-align:top;" |Party
! style="background-color:#E9E9E9;text-align:right;" |Votes
! style="background-color:#E9E9E9;text-align:right;" |%
|-
|style="background-color: " |
|align=left|Sergey Chizhov (incumbent)
|align=left|United Russia
|108,395
|53.14%
|-
|style="background-color: " |
|align=left|Denis Kolomentsev
|align=left|Communist Party
|29,897
|14.66%
|-
|style="background:"|
|align=left|Oksana Averyanova
|align=left|Communists of Russia
|16,019
|7.85%
|-
|style="background-color: " |
|align=left|Galina Yelfimova
|align=left|A Just Russia — For Truth
|13,456
|6.60%
|-
|style="background-color: " |
|align=left|Anna Gurskaya
|align=left|New People
|11,942
|5.85%
|-
|style="background-color: " |
|align=left|Aleksey Kudyakov
|align=left|Liberal Democratic Party
|8,101
|3.97%
|-
|style="background-color: " |
|align=left|Sergey Meleshko
|align=left|Rodina
|4,356
|2.14%
|-
|style="background: "| 
|align=left|Denis Larin
|align=left|The Greens
|3,552
|1.74%
|-
|style="background: "| 
|align=left|Tatyana Shkred
|align=left|Yabloko
|2,477
|1.21%
|-
| colspan="5" style="background-color:#E9E9E9;"|
|- style="font-weight:bold"
| colspan="3" style="text-align:left;" | Total
| 203,973
| 100%
|-
| colspan="5" style="background-color:#E9E9E9;"|
|- style="font-weight:bold"
| colspan="4" |Source:
|
|}

References

References

Russian legislative constituencies
Politics of Voronezh Oblast